United Nations Security Council resolution 1485, adopted unanimously on 30 May 2003, after recalling all previous resolutions on the situation in Western Sahara, particularly Resolution 1429 (2002), the Council extended the mandate of the United Nations Mission for the Referendum in Western Sahara (MINURSO) for two months until 31 July 2003.

The Security Council extended the MINURSO operation to allow Morocco and the Polisario Front further time to consider proposals presented by the Secretary-General's Personal Envoy James Baker III for a political solution to the dispute and provide their views on the Baker Plan. The proposal provided for the self-determination of the people of Western Sahara. In addition, the Special Representative of the Secretary-General was commended for his efforts to resolve humanitarian issues and in the implementation of confidence-building measures proposed by the United Nations High Commissioner for Refugees.

See also
 Free Zone (region)
 Political status of Western Sahara
 List of United Nations Security Council Resolutions 1401 to 1500 (2002–2003)
 Sahrawi Arab Democratic Republic
 Moroccan Western Sahara Wall

References

External links
 
Text of the Resolution at undocs.org

 1485
 1485
 1485
2003 in Morocco
May 2003 events
2003 in Western Sahara